KTOK (1000 AM) is a commercial radio station in Oklahoma City and airs a talk radio format. It is owned by iHeartMedia, Inc., and licensed as iHM Licenses, LLC. The studios and offices are in the 50 Penn Place Building on the northwest side of Oklahoma City.

KTOK transmits 5,800 watts, using a directional antenna at all times, with a three to five-tower array. Because AM 1000 is a clear channel frequency reserved for Class A WMVP in Chicago, KNWN in Seattle and XEOY in Mexico City, KTOK's nighttime signal must protect those stations. The transmitter is located in Moore, Oklahoma, off NE 25th Street. KTOK programming is also heard on co-owned KXXY's HD radio secondary channel and on the iHeartRadio app.

Programming
KTOK has one local talk host each weekday, Lee Matthews. The rest of the weekday schedule is made up of nationally syndicated conservative talk shows, mostly from co-owned Premiere Networks. They include The Glenn Beck Program, The Clay Travis and Buck Sexton Show, The Sean Hannity Show, The Mark Levin Show, The Jesse Kelly Show, Coast to Coast AM with George Noory and This Morning, America's First News with Gordon Deal.

Weekends feature programs on money, health, home repair, real estate and guns. Some weekend shows are paid brokered programming. Syndicated weekend shows include The Weekend with Michael Brown, Sunday Nights with Bill Cunningham and Somewhere in Time with Art Bell.  Most hours begin with world and national news from Fox News Radio.

KTOK, along with the other iHeart stations in Oklahoma City, simulcasts audio of KFOR-TV if a tornado warning is issued within the Oklahoma City metro area.

History

Early years
It was owned by the Full Gospel Church in Oklahoma City. By the 1930s, the station was owned by the Oklahoma Broadcasting Company. It broadcast on 1370 kilocycles and was powered at 100 watts. KGFG's studios were housed in the Cotton Exchange Building.

The call letters were changed to KTOK on February 17, 1937. With WKY as an NBC Red Network station and KOMA carrying the CBS Radio Network, KTOK first became a network affiliate of the Mutual Broadcasting System. By the 1940s, it had switched to the NBC Blue Network (later ABC).

1940s and 50s
In 1941, with the enactment of the North American Regional Broadcasting Agreement (NARBA), KTOK moved to 1400 kHz. The power increased to 250 watts. But management wanted to make KTOK's signal competitive with 930 WKY (5,000 watts) and 1520 KOMA (50,000 watts).

In the late 1940s, KTOK got permission from the Federal Communications Commission to move to 1000 kHz. The power increased to 5,000 watts by day, 1,000 watts at night. The station also added an FM companion. KTOK-FM signed on in 1946 at 104.3 MHz, powered at 43,000 watts. It mostly simulcast the AM station. However, management saw little hope in making KTOK-FM profitable and gave it up after several years.

By the 1950s, as network programming was moving from radio to television, KTOK switched to a full service, middle of the road (MOR) format of popular adult music, news and sports. As WKY and KOMA became youth-oriented Top 40 stations, KTOK began carrying sports from their former networks, NBC and CBS, including the World Series, championship fights and auto racing. An advertisement in the 1960 edition of the Broadcasting Yearbook said KTOK plays "toe-tapping music (no rock and roll) and all of the announcers are adults," to contrast KTOK with the youthful Top 40 disc jockeys on WKY and KOMA.

1960s - 1980s
In the 1960s, the nighttime power increased to match the daytime power, 5,000 watts. But it had to use a complicated directional antenna system to make the higher nighttime power work, while still protecting other stations on AM 1000.

In 1978, KTOK was acquired by the Insilco Broadcasting Group, which also bought an FM station at 102.7, KZUE, which aired an adult contemporary music format. (102.7 today is Top 40/CHR KJYO.)  KTOK became an affiliate of the ABC Information Radio Network.

KTOK gradually increased the talk programming and cut the MOR music programming. By the 1980s, it had become a talk station.

1990s - Today
KTOK and its FM station were acquired in 1992 by San Antonio-based Clear Channel Communications (the forerunner to current owner iHeartMedia). At one time, the news staff numbered 12. iHeart moved its Oklahoma City operations to 50 Penn Place off Northwest Expressway and Interstate 44.

In the 2010s, the station got a slight power increase, going from 5,000 watts to 5,800 watts, day and night. It also got a simulcast on an HD Radio subchannel of co-owned KXXY-FM.

Current and former on-air staff
Show hosts: 

 Dink Bernardi
 Larry Bledsoe
 Jack Bowen
 Robert D. "Bob" Coker
 Carole Arnold
 Jerry Bohnen
 Gene Collett
 Carlton Cordell
 John Dale
 Jason Doyle (host of "Doyle in the Morning")
 Tom Furlong 
 Ken Gaines
 Sharon Gaines
 Mike Hutton
 Niles Jackson
 Dave Marshal
 Greg Merrick (sportscaster) 
 Mike McCarville (afternoon drive show)
 Lee Matthews (weekday mornings & afternoons)
 Greg "Eggman" Moore
 Steve Neumann
 Pam Pryor
 Bob Riggins
 Billie Rodely
 Ed Sossen
 Rick Tasetano 
 Mark Shannon (hosted "The Drive")
 B. J. Wexler (later hosted "KETA-TV" Movie Club)  
 Jim Rupe
 Al Eshbach

News reporters and anchors:

 Tim Allen
 Phil Bacharach
 Bill Bateman
 Natalie Bell
 Megan Bishop 
 Jerry Bohnen
 Bill Boren
 Bob Burke
 Mike Gannon
 Stephanie Chase
 Chris Davala
 Bob Durgin
 Jon Dahlander
 Bob Davidson
 Trey Davis
 Jack Edens 
 Cam Edwards
 Mike Elder
 Brian Gan 
  Melissa Gandal
 Mary Beth Henschel
 Carrie Hulsey
 Steve Jones
 Karen Fuhrmann
 Gwin Faulconer-Lippert
 Jackson Kane
 Delvin Kinser
 Rand Lavonn
 Laura Knoll (later with KGOU)
 Ken Johnson
 Craig Logsdon
 Beth Meyers 
 Dan Mahoney  
 Karen McCoy
 Gene Molter
 Bill Mondora
 Reid Mullins 
 Mark Myers
 Derrick Nance
 Charles Newcomb 
 Joe Oliver
 Jim Palmer
 Jim "Captain" Perdue 
 Randy Pyburn 
 Jim Reagan
 Jacqueline Scott
 Bill Reker
 Randy Renner (sports director, formerly a reporter at CBS affiliate KWTV-TV)
 Mike "Road King" Rogers  
 Scott Rowland
 Cynthia Rozmaryn
 David Rucker
 Mary Shea
 Dawn Shelton
 Bill Simonson
 Matt Skinner
 Linda Steele
 Larry Stein (later the County Assessor for Oklahoma County)
 Merrit Thomas  
 Bryan Walke 
 Kim Walkingstick
 Nate Webb
 Connie Webber
 John Williams
 Calvin Wright 
 John Wright

References

External links
KTOK Home page
KTOK described
KTOK tower site

FCC History Cards for KTOK (covering KGFG / KTOK from 1927-1980)

Radio stations established in 1927
TOK
News and talk radio stations in the United States
1927 establishments in Oklahoma
IHeartMedia radio stations